Vuelta Ciclista Chiapas  was a cycling race held annually in Mexico. It was part of the UCI America Tour in category 2.2.

Winners

References

Cycle races in Mexico
UCI America Tour races
Recurring sporting events established in 2008
Recurring sporting events disestablished in 2011
2008 establishments in Mexico
Defunct sports competitions in Mexico
2011 disestablishments in Mexico
Autumn events in Mexico
Defunct cycling races in Mexico